The DH180 is V-4 diesel piston aircraft engine developed for aircraft applications by DeltaHawk.

In 2014, a DH180 was installed and demonstrated at the EAA Airventure airshow on a Cirrus SR20. A retrofit kit is planned for the SR20.

Applications
Lambert Mission 212
Cirrus SR20
Velocity XL
Van's Aircraft RV-8

Specifications (DH180)

References

External links
Company website
Video of SR20 with DeltaHawk DH180
DeltaHawk aircraft engines
Aircraft diesel engines
1990s aircraft piston engines